Events in the year 2019 in Burkina Faso.

Incumbents 

 President: Roch Marc Christian Kaboré
 Prime Minister: Paul Kaba Thieba (from 2016 until January 19) Christophe Joseph Marie Dabiré (since January 24)

Events 

 January 10 – In a jihadist attack on the village of Gasseliki, 12 civilians are killed.
 January 27 –  At least 10 people are killed in the Soum province after nearly a dozen gunmen opened fire on civilians at a market.

Deaths

References 

 
2010s in Burkina Faso
Years of the 21st century in Burkina Faso
Burkina Faso 
Burkina Faso